() is a bronze sculpture made by Niels Hansen Jacobsen (1861–1941).

The sculpture was modelled between 1895 and 1896. The plaster edition was exhibited at the Charlottenborg Spring Exhibition in 1897. A bronze cast was ordered by brewer Carl Jacobsen in 1901–02. It was originally placed in front of Jacobsen's Church in Valby, Copenhagen, now known as Jesus Church (Jesuskirken), but was too controversial for the parish, so it was moved to the garden of the art museum  Ny Carlsberg Glyptotek. In 1923,  a copy was erected in front of the Vejen Art Museum. In 2002, the church wanted the sculpture back, but the Glyptotek would not part with it, so a copy was made, and placed in front of the church.

The name of the statue is taken from a story in Norse folklore where the hero hides in the troll's castle. Thereafter, whenever the troll enters the castle, he cries: "I smell a Christian man's blood!"

See also
 Ny Carlsberg Glyptotek
 Jesus Church, Valby

References

External links

 Ny Carlsberg Glyptotek

Sculptures by Niels Hansen Jacobsen
Outdoor sculptures in Copenhagen
Sculptures of mythology in Copenhagen
Statues in Copenhagen
Sculptures of the Ny Carlsberg Glyptotek
1896 sculptures
Valby
Bronze sculptures in Copenhagen
Statues in Denmark
Sculptures of mythology
Trolls